Mount Cline is a mountain in western Alberta, Canada,  north of Saskatchewan Crossing,  southwest of Nordegg.

It was named in 1898 by J. Norman Collie, after Michel Klyne (also called Michael Cline), French Canadian postmaster of Jasper House from 1824 to 1835.

Geology
Mount Cline is composed of sedimentary rock laid down during the Precambrian to Jurassic periods. Formed in shallow seas, this sedimentary rock was pushed east and over the top of younger rock during the Laramide orogeny.

Climate
Based on the Köppen climate classification, Mount Cline is located in a subarctic climate with cold, snowy winters, and mild summers.

References 

Three-thousanders of Alberta
Alberta's Rockies